Jordan Thomas Luplow (born September 26, 1993) is an American professional baseball outfielder for the Atlanta Braves of Major League Baseball (MLB). He has previously played in MLB for the Pittsburgh Pirates, Cleveland Indians, Tampa Bay Rays, and Arizona Diamondbacks. He was drafted by the Pirates in the third round of the 2014 MLB draft, and made his debut with the Pirates in 2017.

Amateur career
Luplow attended Buchanan High School in Clovis, California, and played college baseball at Fresno State, where he was teammates with New York Yankees outfielder Aaron Judge for two seasons. Luplow was as a third baseman in high school, but an injury led to Fresno State coaches converting him to an outfielder. He started all 59 games for the Bulldogs as a freshman in 2012, and was named MVP of the WAC Tournament as Fresno State earned an NCAA Tournament berth. Luplow appeared in 41 games as a sophomore, losing part of the season to a shoulder injury.

As a junior in 2014, he was the Mountain West Conference Player of the Year after hitting .377/.475/.609 with 9 HR and 48 RBI in 57 games as Fresno State's right fielder and primary three-hole hitter. After the season, Luplow was named to multiple All-American second and third-teams. While at Fresno State, Luplow was named to two All-Conference Academic Teams. He was also named an All-Star in both the Alaska Baseball League in 2012, and while playing for the Orleans Firebirds of the Cape Cod Baseball League in 2013.

Professional career

Pittsburgh Pirates
Luplow was drafted by the Pittsburgh Pirates in the third round of the 2014 Major League Baseball draft. He signed with the Pirates on June 17, 2014, for a signing bonus worth $500,000. Luplow made his professional debut in 2014 with Short Season Jamestown, where he hit .277 with 30 RBI in 62 games. Luplow played 2015 with the Single-A West Virginia Power, where he was asked to convert to third base, a position he hadn't played since high school. He struggled defensively with 21 errors, but he performed better offensively, hitting .264 with 64 RBI and a team high 12 HR in 106 games. Luplow spent 2016 with High-A Bradenton, where he was converted back to the outfield. In 104 games, he hit .254 with 10 HR and 54 RBI. Luplow started 2017 with Double-A Altoona, but was promoted to Triple-A Indianapolis on June 30. In 73 games with Altoona, Luplow hit .283 with 37 RBI and 16 HR, already a career-high, and was named as an Eastern League All-Star. After just 21 games with a .324 average at Triple-A, Luplow received a promotion to the major leagues, with Pirates manager Clint Hurdle describing the move as "aggressive, but it's the culmination of work we've seen at every step of the way."

On July 28, 2017, Luplow was called up by the Pittsburgh Pirates for the first time, and he made his major league debut that night against the San Diego Padres. He received the start in right field, as regular right fielder Gregory Polanco was placed on the disabled list a week prior.

On September 2, 2017, Luplow got his first career hit and career multi-run homerun, helping the Pittsburgh Pirates beat the Cincinnati Reds, 5–0.

Cleveland Indians
On November 14, 2018, Luplow and Max Moroff were traded to the Cleveland Indians in exchange for Erik González, Tahnaj Thomas and Dante Mendoza. In 85 games with the Indians in 2019, Luplow batted .276/.372/.551 with a career highs in home runs (15) and RBI (38).

Overall with the 2020 Cleveland Indians, Luplow batted .192 with two home runs and 8 RBIs in 29 games. On June 17, 2021, Luplow was placed on the 60-day injured list with a sore left ankle.

Tampa Bay Rays
On July 30, 2021, the Indians traded Luplow and D. J. Johnson to the Tampa Bay Rays in exchange for Peyton Battenfield. He made his debut on August 6, 2021, against the Baltimore Orioles, after Randy Arozarena was placed on the COVID-19 injured list following a close contact. On October 8, 2021, he hit a grand slam in the first inning against Chris Sale of the Boston Red Sox in the ALDS at Tropicana Field.

Arizona Diamondbacks
On November 26, 2021, the Rays traded Luplow to the Arizona Diamondbacks in exchange for Ronny Simon. Luplow was designated for assignment on November 15, 2022, and subsequently elected free agency.

Atlanta Braves
On December 19, 2022, Luplow signed a one-year, $1.4 million contract with the Atlanta Braves.

Personal life
Luplow is the great-nephew of outfielder Al Luplow, who had a seven-year ML career with the Indians, Pirates, and New York Mets during the 1960s.

References

External links

Fresno State Bulldogs bio

1993 births
Living people
Sportspeople from Visalia, California
Baseball players from California
Major League Baseball outfielders
Pittsburgh Pirates players
Cleveland Indians players
Tampa Bay Rays players
Arizona Diamondbacks players
Fresno State Bulldogs baseball players
Orleans Firebirds players
Jamestown Jammers players
West Virginia Power players
Bradenton Marauders players
Altoona Curve players
Indianapolis Indians players
Durham Bulls players
Anchorage Glacier Pilots players